Kapetan Mitrousi is a former municipality in the Serres regional unit, Greece. Since the 2011 local government reform it is part of the municipality Serres, of which it is a municipal unit. It is located in the west-central part of the Serres regional unit and has a population of 5,325 inhabitants (2011 census) and a land area of 87.485 km². The seat of the municipality was the town of Provatas (pop. 1,099). Its other towns are Mitroúsi (pop. 1,479), Anagénnisis (752), Áno Kamíla (682), Vamvakiá (530), Káto Mitroúsi (472), and Monokklisia (311).

References

Populated places in Serres (regional unit)